"Ty kto takoy? Davay, do svidaniya!" (meaning "Who are you? Hey, Goodbye!") is a title of the viral video, showing meykhana performance with repeating Russian hook "Ty kto takoy? Davay, do svidaniya!" by two brothers Intigam and Ehtiram Rustamov from Azerbaijan. The video was filmed on 5 November 2011 at a wedding in Tangarud, Azerbaijan and was subsequently viewed over 10 million times on YouTube. It is sung in the form of flyting between Talysh and Baku groups in Azerbaijani, Talysh and Russian. The video was also viewed over 10 million times at theinstv, the YouTube channel of Insanity TV.

Political references 

The hook itself was used particularly by the Russian Car Owners Federation official Andrey Filin, who had written on Twitter: "Tomorrow I'll hang a sign on my car: 'Putin, who are you? See you, goodbye'. I'll make people smile".

Filin's phrase "Putin, who are you? Come on, goodbye" was in turn propagated by the press secretary of Ilya Ponomarev and by the Russian art group Voyna. The Russian hashtag #путинтыктотакойдавайдосвидания ("Putin, who are you? Come on, goodbye") began spreading in Twitter on 29 May 2012 and entered Twitter's worldwide trends the next day. The phrase "Who are you? See you, goodbye" later appeared on picket banners in Russia.

In August 2012, a group of Georgian opposition members used the phrase "Ty kto takoy? Davay, do svidaniya!" targeting president Mikheil Saakashvili in a performance of their own, which they sang in Georgian and released online. The phrase addressed to the Hungarian government was used on placards posted around Yerevan, Armenia during a protest at the Consulate of Hungary on 1 September 2012, upon the extradition of officer Ramil Safarov, who had been convicted by a Hungarian court for murdering his Armenian counterpart in 2004.

Media references
The hook "Ty kto takoy? Davay, do svidaniya!" has been repeatedly remixed and was sampled for dubstep and tech house mashup. Russian rapper Timati sampled the hook for his diss song against Philipp Kirkorov, with participants fashioning the dress style and locale of the original video.  "Ty kto takoy? Davay, do svidaniya!" is also the subject of one of the sketches of Russian Lego Life Show on YouTube. The phrase also influenced an article on the Russian sports news website Sportbox, which wrote about the "unpleasing list with trendy title "Who are you? See you, goodbye!" in connection with the group stage of UEFA Euro 2012. The phrase "Who are you? See you, goodbye!" was also uttered by Russian sportcaster Viktor Gusev during a Euro 2012 match between Sweden and Ukraine.

References

Viral videos
2011 YouTube videos
Russian words and phrases
Political catchphrases
2011 neologisms
2011 works
2011 in Azerbaijan
Internet memes introduced in the 2010s
Meykhana